In 2015 the Fótbolti.net Cup, a football competition in Iceland, was won by the Breiðablik UBK team from Kópavogur.

Groups

Group A

Group B

Third place

Fifth place

Final

External links
 Results, Futbol24.com
 Results, Soccerway

Fotbolti